Gloria Oloruntobi (born February 6, 1997), better known as Maraji, is a Nigerian comedian. She started her career making lip sync videos and miming songs. Maraji role-plays in her comedy skits and switches between accents and vocal pitches to suit each character she plays.

Education 
Maraji is from Edo State. She graduated with a bachelor's degree in international relations from Covenant University in 2017.

Maraji was featured in the music videos for Falz's "Something Light" and Yemi Alade's "Single and Searching".

Awards and nominations 
Maraji was nominated for Prize for Comedy at the 2017 and 2018 The Future Awards Africa. She was also nominated for Comedy Act of the Year at the 2018 City People Music Awards.

References 

Nigerian women comedians
People from Edo State
1997 births
Covenant University alumni
Living people